Santa Rosa is the Italian, Portuguese and Spanish name for Saint Rose.

Santa Rosa may also refer to:

Places

Argentina
Santa Rosa, Mendoza, a city
Santa Rosa, Tinogasta, Catamarca
Santa Rosa, Valle Viejo, Catamarca
Santa Rosa, La Pampa
Santa Rosa, Salta
Santa Rosa de Calamuchita, Córdoba
Santa Rosa de Calchines, Santa Fe
Santa Rosa de Río Primero, Córdoba
Santa Rosa Department, Catamarca
Santa Rosa Department, Mendoza

Bolivia
Santa Rosa, Bolivia, a remote rural village in Santa Cruz
Santa Rosa, Mapiri
Santa Rosa de Yacuma
Santa Rosa Municipality, Beni

Brazil
Santa Rosa, Rio Grande do Sul
Santa Rosa, Goiás
Santa Rosa de Viterbo, São Paulo
Santa Rosa do Purus (Acre)
Santa Rosa de Lima, Sergipe

Colombia
Santa Rosa, Bolívar
Santa Rosa, Cauca
Santa Rosa de Osos (Antioquia)
Santa Rosa de Cabal (Risaralda)
Santa Rosa de Viterbo, Boyacá
Santa Rosa del Sur (Bolívar)

Costa Rica
Santa Rosa Abajo
Santa Rosa National Park, site of the 1856 Battle of Santa Rosa

Curaçao
Santa Rosa, Curaçao

Ecuador
Santa Rosa, El Oro
Santa Rosa Canton, El Oro Province
Santa Rosa de Yanamaru, site of a March 2008 Colombian border raid

El Salvador
Santa Rosa de Lima
Santa Rosa Guachipilín

Guatemala
Santa Rosa Cuilapa, Santa Rosa
Santa Rosa de Lima, Santa Rosa
Santa Rosa Department, Guatemala

Guyana
Santa Rosa, Guyana

Honduras
Santa Rosa de Aguán, Colón
Santa Rosa de Copán, Copán

Mexico
Santa Rosa Jáuregui, Querétaro
Santa Rosa, former name of Clarion Island in the Revillagigedo Islands

Nicaragua
Santa Rosa del Peñón, León

Panama
Santa Rosa, Chiriquí
Santa Rosa, Colón
Santa Rosa, Panamá Oeste

Paraguay
Santa Rosa, Paraguay or Santa Rosa de Lima, a town and district in Misiones Department
Santa Rosa, Asunción, a neighbourhood (barrio)
Santa Rosa del Aguaray a district in the San Pedro Department
Santa Rosa del Mbutuy a town and district in the Caaguazú department
Santa Rosa del Monday, a town and district in Alto Paraná Department

Peru
Santa Rosa de Yavarí, a town in Loreto
Santa Rosa District (disambiguation), districts in Peru

Philippines
Santa Rosa, Laguna
Santa Rosa Integrated Terminal, a bus station
SM City Santa Rosa, a shopping mall
Santa Rosa, Nueva Ecija
Santa Rosa del Sur, village in Pasacao, Camarines Sur
Santa Rosa railway station, Laguna

Puerto Rico
 Santa Rosa, Guaynabo, Puerto Rico, a barrio in Puerto Rico
 Santa Rosa, Lajas, Puerto Rico, a barrio in Puerto Rico
 Santa Rosa, Utuado, Puerto Rico, a barrio in Puerto Rico

Spain
 Santa Rosa (Mieres), a parish in Asturias

United States
Santa Rosa, Arizona, also known as Kaij Mek
Santa Rosa, California
Santa Rosa Valley, California, an unincorporated census-designated place east of Camarillo, California
Santa Rosa Valley, the eponymous valley in the unincorporated area east of Camarillo, California
Santa Rosa Island, California, one of the Channel Islands of California
Santa Rosa Creek in Sonoma County, California
Santa Rosa Rancheria, an Indian Reservation in Central California
Santa Rosa Mountains (California), a short mountain range in the Peninsular Ranges system
Santa Rosa Island, Florida, a barrier island
Santa Rosa County, Florida
Santa Rosa, Missouri
Santa Rosa Range, a mountain range in northern Nevada
Santa Rosa, New Mexico
Santa Rosa, Texas, in Cameron County
Santa Rosa, Starr County, Texas, a census-designated place

Uruguay
 Santa Rosa, Uruguay, a small city in the Canelones Department

Other uses
Santa Rosa (1726), a Portuguese galleon
"Santa Rosa" (ABBA song), song by ABBA, b-side of "He Is Your Brother" single
Santa Rosa (Barcelona Metro), a station in Santa Coloma de Gramenet, Spain
Santa Rosa station (Lima Metro), a station in Lima, Peru
Santa Rosa (mountain), an Andean peak in Peru
Santa Rosa Church, Florence, a sanctuary church in Tuscany, Italy
Santa Rosa Church, Paramaribo, a church in Paramaribo
Santa Rosa Esporte Clube, a Brazilian soccer club
Santa Rosa platform, code name for Intel's Centrino platform
Santa Rosa storm, a storm occurring in the Southern Hemisphere on or around August 30 each year
Santa Rosa First Peoples Community, an organisation of indigenous people in Trinidad and Tobago
FM Santa Rosa, a local radio station broadcasting from the city of Pilar, Buenos Aires, Argentina
Macchina di Santa Rosa, a perennially rebuilt tower in Viterbo, Italy

See also
Battle of Santa Rosa, an 1856 conflict in Costa Rica
Battle of Santa Rosa Island, an 1861 American Civil War conflict in Florida
Saint Rose (disambiguation)
Santa Rosa Department (disambiguation)
Santa Rosa Cathedral (disambiguation)